The 2021–22 South Florida Bulls women's basketball team represented the University of South Florida in the 2021–22 NCAA Division I women's basketball season. The Bulls, coached by Jose Fernandez in his 22nd season, played their home games at the USF Sun Dome in Tampa, Florida. This was be USF's ninth season as a member of the American Athletic Conference, known as The American or AAC. They finished the season 24–9, 12–3 in AAC play to finish in second place. They advanced to the championship game of the American Athletic Conference women's tournament where they lost to UCF. They received at-large bid to the NCAA women's tournament where they lost to Miami in the first round.

Previous season 
The Bulls finished the 2020–21 season 19–4, 13–2 in AAC play to finish win their first ever American Athletic championship. USF won the AAC tournament, by defeating UCF in the championship game. They received an automatic bid to the NCAA tournament as a No. 8 seed where they defeated No. 9 seed Washington State in the first round to before losing to No. 1 seed NC State in the second round.

Media
All Bulls games aired on Bullscast Radio or CBS 1010 AM. All home games and home and away conference games were available on one of the ESPN networks or their streaming service ESPN+.

Roster

Schedule

|-
!colspan=6 style=| Non-conference regular season

|-
!colspan=9 style=| AAC regular season

|-
!colspan=9 style=|AAC Women's Tournament

|-
!colspan=9 style=|NCAA Women's Tournament

Rankings

Coaches' Poll did not release a second poll at the same time as the AP.

See also
2021–22 South Florida Bulls men's basketball team

References

South Florida Bulls women's basketball seasons
South Florida
South Florida
South Florida Bulls women's basketball
South Florida Bulls women's basketball